The Investigation of Hydell is an adventure module published in 1982 for the Advanced Dungeons & Dragons fantasy role-playing game.

Plot summary
The Investigation of Hydell is an adventure in which the player characters investigate a slave trading organization.

Publication history
R-2 The Investigation of Hydell was written by Frank Mentzer, with a cover by Jim Holloway, and published by TSR/RPGA in 1982 as a 16-page booklet with an outer folder. The module was a limited edition, sold only to members of the RPGA. It was later rewritten, and collected with the other modules from the R-series in I12 Egg of the Phoenix.

Reception

Reviews

References

Dungeons & Dragons modules
Role-playing game supplements introduced in 1982